The Blackburn Female Reform Society was established in Blackburn in early July 1819. They immediately sent a circular to other districts, inviting the wives and daughters of the workmen in the different branches of manufacturing to form themselves into similar societies. In response Manchester formed their own society of reformers on 20 July 1819. In Nottingham, reformers decided to adopt the Blackburn model.

The Blackburn reformers model involved gift-giving, including the presentation of caps of liberty, action which was mirrored by societies in Stockport and Galston.

References 

Women's organisations based in England
1819 in England
Women's rights organizations